The Copyright Association was an English organisation founded in 1872 for "authors, publishers and other persons interested in copyright property", which together with the Society of Authors lobbied Parliament on copyright issues in the decades before the 1911 Copyright Act.

In the early 1870s, English publishers were especially concerned to protect the rights of their authors in Canada, since the Canadian Government was pressing for the right to reprint British works in Canada subject to an excise duty. The association's initial committee included both authors (including Robert Browning, Arthur Helps, William Smith, Charles Reade and Charles Edward Trevelyan) and publishers (including John Murray (1808-1892), Thomas Longman (1804-1879), Alexander Macmillan, George Bentley (1818-1895) and George Routledge).

References

Organizations established in 1872
Copyright law organizations
Business organisations based in the United Kingdom
United Kingdom copyright law
1872 establishments in England